Mayfield, also known as the William Wilson House, is a historic home located near Middletown, New Castle County, Delaware.  It was built about 1839, and is a -story, five bay, center hall plan brick dwelling with a two-story, rear service wing.  The house is in a vernacular Greek Revival style. It measures approximately 45 feet wide and 25 feet deep.  It features a steeply pitched gable roof with dormers and tetrastyle, Greek-Revival style porch on brick footings.

It was listed on the National Register of Historic Places in 1997.

References

Houses on the National Register of Historic Places in Delaware
Greek Revival houses in Delaware
Houses completed in 1839
Houses in New Castle County, Delaware
National Register of Historic Places in New Castle County, Delaware